The Cormorant Communications Network is a military wide area communications network implemented by the British Army sometime around 2000. It has also been adopted by certain Royal Air Force units in limited deployments.

Role
The network provides end-to-end wide area communications using the same Asynchronous Transfer Mode protocol that underpins many late-20th Century civilian telecommunications networks. It supports voice traffic routed over IP (although this is distinct from Internet VoIP) and can also support IPv4 and IPv6 BTDS traffic.

Criticisms
On 10 September 2009 the MoD announced that the system was to be withdrawn from service in Afghanistan and replaced with a system from Israel called Radwin .

References

British military radio
British Army equipment